Jayden Halbgewachs (born March 22, 1997) is a Canadian professional ice hockey forward currently playing for the Växjö Lakers of the Swedish Hockey League (SHL). He formerly played for the San Jose Sharks of the National Hockey League (NHL).

Early life
Halbgewachs was born on March 22, 1997, in Regina, Saskatchewan, to father Jamie. He grew up as the middle of two other brothers, Taylor and Brandon.

Playing career

Amateur
Growing up in Emerald Park, Saskatchewan, Halbgewachs played bantam AA ice hockey for the Prairie Storm before being drafted in the 2012 Western Hockey League (WHL) Draft by the Kamloops Blazers. In his last season of bantam AA, Halbgewachs recorded 89 points, including 55 goals, in 24 games. During this time, he also attended Greenall School and said his favourite subject was mathematics. Although Halbgewachs signed his WHL contract with the Blazers, he was traded to the Moose Jaw Warriors before playing his first major junior hockey game.

Halbgewachs experienced a breakout season during his 2017–18 campaign and gained attention from NHL teams. After going undrafted in the 2017 NHL Entry Draft, Halbgewachs signed an entry-level contract with the San Jose Sharks on December 28, 2017. At the time of his signing, he had recorded 61 points in 36 games and led all Canadian junior players in goals. Halbgewachs concluded the season with 70 goals in 72 games, becoming the first WHL player to reach the 70-goal plateau since Pavel Brendl during the 1998–99 season. As a result of his 129 overall points, which helped the Moose Jaw claim the WHL Regular Season title, he was recognized as the CHL's CCM Top Scorer. He was also named to the WHL Eastern Conference First All-Star Team.

Professional
Halbgewachs began his first professional season with the San Jose Sharks organization during the 2018–19 season. While attending the Sharks' 2018 training camp, he said his goal was to "continue to grow and prove myself each and every day and I think good things will happen." He was re-assigned to the Sharks' American Hockey League (AHL) team, the San Jose Barracuda, to begin the season and he subsequently spent his entire rookie campaign with the team. Halbgewachs recorded his first professional goal on October 6 in a 5–1 win over the Bakersfield Condors. By the end of October, he was tied for co-leader on the team in goals and points.

After concluding the 2019–20 season with 35 points in 55 games, Halbgewachs signed a two-year contract extension with the Sharks on October 6, 2020. After attending the Sharks' training camp prior to the shortened 2020–21 season, Halbgewachs was re-assigned to the Barracuda to begin the season. After recording four goals in 17 games, he was called up the Sharks' taxi squad. He made his NHL debut on December 17, 2021, in a 2–5 loss to the Vancouver Canucks. His first point, as assist, came on December 28, 2021, in 8–7 shootout victory over the Arizona Coyotes. In the 2022 offseason, he signed for Swedish team Växjö Lakers.

Career statistics

Regular season and playoffs

International

Awards and honours

References

External links

1997 births
Living people
Canadian expatriate ice hockey players in the United States
Canadian ice hockey left wingers
Ice hockey people from Saskatchewan
Moose Jaw Warriors players
San Jose Barracuda players
San Jose Sharks players
Undrafted National Hockey League players
Växjö Lakers players